Anbe Anbe is a 2003 Indian Tamil-language romantic drama film directed by Mani Bharathi. The film stars Shaam and Sharmili, while an ensemble supporting cast includes  Vivek,  Yugendran, M. N. Nambiar, Manorama, and Santhoshi. The music was composed by Bharadwaj. The film released on 1 May 2003 and opened to mixed reviews from critics. The film's plot is loosely based on the Hindi film Hum Aapke Hain Koun..! (1994).

Plot 
An extended family that includes two grandparents named Mahendra Bhoopathy and Vishali, their two sons and one daughter, and four grandchildren (including Cheenu and Shiva), and others come together for Mahendra Bhoopathy's 80th birthday. Mahendra Bhoopathy's and Vishali's daughter comes to see them after a long time. Their granddaughter has the name as her grandmother: Vishali. Issues arise due to greed from the son-in-law, his brother, and Cheenu's birth mother to get more than their appropriated share of the property. Further chaos ensues when the evil Shiva falls in love with the granddaughter Vishali, whom Cheenu is in love with. How the family is reunited and the problems are solved forms the rest of the plot.

Cast  

Sham as Cheenu
Sharmili as Vishali
Vivek as Cheenu's uncle
Yugendran as Shiva
M. N. Nambiar as Mahendra Bhoopathy
Manorama as Vishali
Manivannan as Mahendra Bhoopathy's son-in-law's brother
Thalaivasal Vijay as Mahendra Bhoopathy's son
Poovilangu Mohan as Shiva's father
Senthil as a servant
Sindhu as a servant
Ramya Krishnan as a dancer in "Vasthu Sasthiram"
Santhoshi as Mahendra Bhoopathy's granddaughter
Vanitha Krishnachandran as Mahendra Bhoopathy's daughter
Nithya as Cheenu's birth mother
Janavi as Shiva's mother
Archana Reddy as Cheenu's adoptive mother
Scissor Manohar as a beggar
Mohan V. Raman as Mahendra Bhoopathy's son-in-law
M. S. Bhaskar as Mahendra Bhoopathy's son-in-law
Master Naresh Sha as childhood Cheenu
Bonda Mani as Bonda Mani

Production 
Manibharati, who worked as an assistant to  Mani Ratnam, Saran and Vasanth, announced that he was making a love story for AVM Productions. Shaam was signed on to play the lead role, which was initially titled as Romeo and Juliet. Actress Priyamani was approached for the project but she turned down the offer, meaning that Sharmelee was signed to play the lead role. Shamelee, who had been studying for a computer degree, earlier signed Aasai Aasaiyai and the Telugu film Taarak before signing this film.

Soundtrack
Soundtrack was composed by Bharadwaj.

Reception
Sify wrote "There is nothing new in the story and director Manibharathi has not been able to tell this weak story with conviction". Malini Mannath of Chennai Online opined that "Directed by debutant Mani Bharati, the film is an average entertainer, that can hardly boast of any freshness in the scripting or narrative style". The film portal BB Thots wrote that "The movie is woefully short on everything required for an engaging love story and is a failure right from the word go".

References

External links
Anbe Anbe on IMDB

2003 films
Indian romantic drama films
2000s Tamil-language films
Films scored by Bharadwaj (composer)
2003 romantic drama films
2003 directorial debut films